CJP may refer to:

 Canadian Journal of Philosophy
 Canadian Journal of Physics
 Canadian Journalism Project
 Congress Jananayaka Peravai
 Capital Jury Project
 Caribbean Jazz Project
 Chief Justice of Pakistan
 Chinese Journal of Physics